High Flyers is an Australian children's television series which first screened on the Seven Network in 1999. The series ran for two seasons and was aimed at children and teenagers. It was produced by Southern Star Entertainment.

Premise
High Flyers follows the adventures and triumphs of a group of children as they discover and develop their talents in an extraordinary children's circus. Luke and Phoebe move to the country but the first impressions of their new home aren't encouraging until they discover the town has its own circus, managed by Caz.

Cast

Main
 Clayton Watson as Luke
 Emily Browning as Phoebe
 Jane Hall as Caz
 Robert Grubb as Mr. Bull
 Andrew Clarke 
 Anthony Hammer
 Jade Butler as Julianna "Jules" Price
 Brandon Burns as Bert

Supporting
 Bartholomew Nash as Trevor
 Algin Abella as Kyet Nguyen
 Katy Brinson as Sarah
 Denise Briskin as Taya
 Christopher Brown as Steve
 Zane Elvis De Courcy as Mitchell "Mitch" Price
 Serge De Nardo as Pablo
 Carmelina Di Guglielmo as Rosa
 Hannah Greenwood as Dallas
 Talia Krape as Carmen Price
 Scott Mackenzie as Simmo
 Nikolai Nikolaeff as Nick
 Alex Menglet as Alexi
 Bonnie Piesse as Donna
 Rhona Rees as Charlie

References

External links
 
 High Flyers at the Australian Television Information Archive
 High Flyers at Australian Screen Online

Seven Network original programming
Australian children's television series
1999 Australian television series debuts
2000 Australian television series endings
English-language television shows
Television series by Endemol Australia